Agchia is a town in Kamrup district of Assam, situated on the south bank of the Brahmaputra River between Boko and Chaygaon towns.

Transportation
Agchia is connected to nearby towns through National highway 17.

See also
 Aggumi

References

Villages in Kamrup district